Big Brother Greece 2, was the second season of the Greek reality television series Big Brother. The show followed fourteen contestants, known as housemates, who were isolated from the outside world for an extended period of time in a custom-built house. Each week, one or more of the housemates were evicted by a public vote. 

The last remaining housemate, Alexandros Moskhos, was declared the winner, winning a cash prize of €150,000.

The season lasted 116 days and was presented by Andreas Mikroutsikos. It launched on ANT1 on March 8, 2002 and ended on July 1, 2002.

Housemate election 
A week before the launch of the season, the public was able to choose two of the housemates, one male and one female. The voted between 18 candidates chosen by the producers. The public vote started on March 2, 2002

Finally, Panagiotis and Tina have received the most votes and became official housemates.

Housemates

Nominations table
The first housemate in each box was nominated for two points, and the second housemate was nominated for one point.

Website

 https://web.archive.org/web/20021010042115/http://bigbrother.gr/home/0,1001,10,00.html (News Stories Archive)

References

2002 Greek television seasons
02